Rivanílton de França, also known as Rivan (born 12 May 1981) is a Brazilian football player that usually plays as a left midfielder.

Club career 
He was born in Sergipe. After playing with Vitória de Santo Antão and Cruzeiro, in 2001, he moved to Serbia and signed with top league club FK Rad. He made 3 appearances in the 2001–02 First League of FR Yugoslavia.  He signed a contract but, after not getting many chances, he was loaned to FK Hajduk Beograd. After a couple of years, he returned to Brazil to play in the giant Vitória. His second European adventure was in Portugal where he played one season in Gil Vicente F.C. in the Portuguese Liga.

Afterwards he represented Boca Júnior, Itaúna, São Domingos and América (SE).

References

External sources 
 
 Profile at Srbijafudbal
 2002 Brazil exports at CBF.
 2005 Brazil returns and imports at CBF.
 2006 Brazil exports at CBF.

Living people
1981 births
Sportspeople from Sergipe
Brazilian footballers
Brazilian expatriate footballers
Association football midfielders
Cruzeiro Esporte Clube players
FK Rad players
FK Hajduk Beograd players
First League of Serbia and Montenegro players
Expatriate footballers in Serbia and Montenegro
Esporte Clube Vitória players
Gil Vicente F.C. players
Primeira Liga players
Expatriate footballers in Portugal